Jorge Otero-Pailos (born 27 October 1971) is an artist, preservation architect, theorist and educator, commonly associated with experimental preservation and the journal Future Anterior. He is best known for his “The Ethics of Dust” ongoing series of artworks derived from the cleaning of monuments, which was exhibited at the 53rd Venice Biennale. Westminster Hall, the Victoria & Albert Museum, and SFMoMA, amongst others. He is Director and Professor of Historic Preservation at Columbia University Graduate School of Architecture, Planning and Preservation (Columbia GSAPP).

Early life and education
Jorge Otero-Pailos was born in Madrid, the only son of Justo Otero, a landscape painter and forestry engineer, and María Jesús Pailos, a computer scientist. His early childhood was marked by international travel to historic sites, facilitated by his mother's employment by Iberia Airlines, and Spain's transition from dictatorship to democracy, which made it easier for Spaniards to go abroad.  He attended the Lycée Français de Madrid, an international secular school in a country where Catholic education was the norm.  His father taught him painting. In 1985, Otero-Pailos traveled to the United States through a study abroad program, and was a foreign exchange student at Barrington High School, a suburb of Chicago, Illinois, where his art teacher introduced him to Frank Lloyd Wright, and encouraged him to study architecture.

Otero-Pailos received a Bachelors of Architecture (1994) and a Masters of Urban Design (1995) from Cornell University College of Architecture, Art, and Planning, where he was awarded the Richmond Harold Shreve Award for best graduate thesis.  He studied design with the Texas Rangers (architects) Colin Rowe, John Shaw, and Lee Hodgden, and studied theory with art historian Hal Foster, who introduced him to psychoanalytic theory, and became a pupil of philosopher Susan Buck-Morss, who trained him in Critical Theory. In 1991, he founded the student journal Submission, to advance theoretical discourse within the school. Together with fellow students Alfonso D’Onofrio and Jess Mullen-Carey, he conceived and directed the public television series V.E.T.V. (Visual Evangelist Tele Vision), which explored the relationship between architecture, broadcasting and digital media. V.E.T.V. featured surrealist scenes acted by fellow students and narrated by Otero-Pailos, spliced between interviews with Mark Jarzombek, Rem Koolhaas, Mark Wigley, Susan Buck-Morss, and others.

Academic career 
In 1995, Otero-Pailos moved to San Juan to join Jorge Rigau in the effort to found the New School of Architecture at the Polytechnic University of Puerto Rico.  Otero-Pailos was the school's first full-time professor. He received the Angel Ramos Foundation Research Grant to continue his investigation of the relationship between architecture and media, this time focused on the portrayal of Puerto Rican social violence and architecture in the news. This research led him to co-organize with Vikramaditya Prakash “Re-Envisioning San Juan: Identity Politics and Architecture,” an international symposium and workshop leading to socially engaged proposals for public art in San Juan. He continued to produce and exhibit his paintings, collages and sculptures made of recycled materials in galleries, and wrote opinion pieces about architecture and urbanism in the press.

In 1997, Otero-Pailos conducted doctoral studies at the MIT School of Architecture and Planning under Prof. Mark Jarzombek, and wrote a dissertation on the history of architectural phenomenology,  which was later published as the book “Architecture’s Historical Turn: Phenomenology and the Rise of the Postmodern”

In 2002, Otero-Pailos was appointed Assistant Professor of Historic Preservation at Columbia University Graduate School of Architecture, Planning and Preservation.

In 2004 he founded the journal Future Anterior,  the first scholarly journal in the US to focus on the history theory and criticism of historic preservation, published by the University of Minnesota Press.

He has contributed to numerous scholarly journals and books including the Oxford Encyclopedia of Aesthetics, and Rem Koolhaas’ Preservation Is Overtaking Us (2014).

In 2016, he was appointed as the Director of Historic Preservation at Columbia University GSAPP.

In 2018, Columbia GSAPP launches country’s first PhD program in historic preservation. Otero-Pailos collaborated with Dean Amale Andraos and Dean Emeritus Mark Wigley to create the program.  https://archpaper.com/2018/01/columbia-gsapp-first-phd-historic-preservation/

Collaborations with architects

Masterplan for New Holland Island with WORK AC 
In 2013, Otero-Pailos was selected as Preservation Architect to work on New Holland Island, an 8-hectare site located the historic center of St. Petersburg, Russia. Otero-Pailos collaborated with Work Architecture Company, Master Planner and Design Architect. The client team was Dasha Zukhova and Roman Abramovitz. Otero-Pailos won the American Institute of Architects Merit Award (2013) for his contribution to this project.

Artistic career

Influences 
In an interview with M.I.T. Art Initiative, Otero-Pailos cites his father as a key figure in his artistic development. Otero-Pailos explains how his father would bring him along as "he would set up easels at the Prado Museum, copying paintings by Goya" and how "Trips to the Parthenon in Greece and Teotihuacan in Mexico cultivated a lifelong interest in architecture and its connection to art." Otero-Pailos credits Krzysztof Wodiczko, a Polish artist who works on architectural facades and monuments for making him realize that “Art can make monuments speak in a contemporary language.” Otero-Pailos further credits Leila W. Kinney, the Executive Director of Arts Initiatives and the Center for Art, Science & Technology, at M.I.T, for introducing him to sculptor Eva Hesse, whose work with latex became a major influence for Otero-Pailos.

The Ethics of Dust (2008 to present) 
The Ethics of Dust is a series of artworks where Otero-Pailos transfers the pollution on monuments onto latex casts. The title of the series indicates a dialogue with John Ruskin, one of the founders of preservation. Each work in the series is distinguished by the subtitle, which takes the name of the monument.

Works in the series thus far include:
 The Ethics of Dust: Ex-Alumix (2008)
 The Ethics of Dust: Doge's Palace (2009)
 The Ethics of Dust: Carthago Nova (2013)
 The Ethics of Dust: Trajan's Column (2015)
 The Ethics of Dust: Maison de Famille Louis Vuitton (2015) 
 The Ethics of Dust: Old United States Mint (2015)
 The Ethics of Dust: Westminster Hall (2016)

Distributed Monuments (2017 to present) 
Distributed Monuments is a body of work made of dust transferred onto latex casts and enclosed in light boxes. Each cast is extracted from distinct site-specific interventions performed by Otero-Pailos as part of his series of works called The Ethics of Dust. The artworks’ materials come from monuments such as Westminster Hall in London, the Doge's Palace in Venice, or the U.S. Old Mint in San Francisco. Designed to be easily transported, Otero-Pailos explains in an interview for ArtSpace that the work "questions our relationship with building as cultural objects and inspire us to care for the object as such, to become cultural stewards." The Distributed Monuments series was first exhibited at the Seaman's House, a 2017 exhibition in the Chelsea district of New York City curated by Helen Allen Smith, and second at the Chicago Architecture Biennial 2017 titled Make New History curated by Artistic Directors Sharon Johnston and Mark Lee of the Los Angeles–based firm Johnston Marklee. Otero-Pailos' contribution to the Chicago Architecture Biennial received positive critical reviews.

Répétiteur (2018) 
Otero-Pailos was invited by New York City Center to create a site-specific art installation as part of the Center's inaugural program of visual art commissions and the Merce Cunningham Centennial. Otero-Pailos was one of three artists invited, alongside photographer Nina Robinson, and conceptual artist Lawrence Weiner. Otero-Pailos created a series of artworks titled Répétiteur, a work reflecting on the history of dance and the labor involved with passing on the knowledge of a dance to a new generation of dancers. The installation derives its name from the term “répétiteur,” a person entrusted with teaching, coaching, and rehearsing a choreographer's work. It is the first time that Otero-Pailos not only uses his signature language of dust and liquid latex, but also introduces sound collages, and flips the verticality of the wall onto the horizontality of the floor. The exhibition received positive critical reviews from the press including an art review in the New York Times in April 2019 (https://www.nytimes.com/2019/04/29/arts/design/jorge-otero-pailos-repetiteur.html)

Space-Time 1964-2014
Space-Time is a reconstruction of Harold Edgerton's iconic 1964 photograph “Bullet Through Apple,” done in collaboration with the MIT Museum, the Edgerton Center, and the MIT Department of Architecture. Otero-Pailos used Edgerton's own instruments to take the photo again, 50 years later. While conducting the reconstruction, examining the direction of the bullet's rotation, Otero-Pailos discovered that Edgerton had flipped the negative while printing his photograph, and that the iconic image is in fact backwards. Otero-Pailos decided to “correct” this. In his photograph, the bullet travels left to right, rather than right to left as in the original.

Continuous Cities
Continuous Cities is a series of work consisting of city maps that the artist has collected since the '90s and on which he has painted patterns. In discussing the work in an interview with ArtSpace, Otero-Pailos says that he considers "Cities as the major long-lasting monuments that we are collectively constructing together as a civilization."

References

https://www.metropolismag.com/ideas/arts-culture/jorge-otero-pailos-repetiteur-dance/
https://news.columbia.edu/content/historic-preservation-program-conserves-the-past-for-the-future
https://news.columbia.edu/content/on-exhibit-materializing-dance
https://news.artnet.com/art-world/editors-picks-october-15-1361176
https://www.architecturalrecord.com/articles/13257-interview-with-jorge-otero-pailos?v=preview

Preservationist architects
21st-century American architects
21st-century Spanish architects
Cornell University College of Architecture, Art, and Planning alumni
1971 births
Living people
Columbia Graduate School of Architecture, Planning and Preservation faculty